Maceo Richard Clark (July 9, 1897 – July 29, 1990) was an American Negro league pitcher in the 1920s.

A native of Chatham, Virginia, Clark attended Howard University. He made his Negro leagues debut in 1923 with the Washington Potomacs, and played three seasons for the club, which moved to Wilmington in 1925. Clark died in Moraine, Ohio in 1990 at age 93.

References

External links
 and Baseball-Reference Black Baseball stats and Seamheads

1897 births
1990 deaths
Washington Potomacs players
Wilmington Potomacs players
Baseball pitchers
Baseball players from Virginia
People from Chatham, Virginia
20th-century African-American sportspeople